Avun (also, Aun) is a village in the Yardymli Rayon of Azerbaijan.  The village forms part of the municipality of Urakəran.

References 

Populated places in Yardimli District